John S. L. Williamson  (born January 30, 1970) is a Canadian politician who has represented the riding of New Brunswick Southwest in the House of Commons of Canada as a member of the Conservative Party of Canada since 2019. He represented the riding from 2011 until his defeat in the 2015 election. He was elected again in the 2019 election.

Education
Williamson graduated from Fredericton High School, and then McGill University with a degree in economics and political science. He later went on to receive a master's degree in economic history at the London School of Economics. Mr. Williamson is an heraldic heir, entitled to inherit a coat of arms. . Although he is a professed monarchist and his father's armorial achievement bears Loyalist symbolism, both his parents were born in the United States.

Early career
Williamson joined the National Post as an editorial writer and was a founding member of the newspaper's editorial board (1998-2001) before moving on to the Canadian Taxpayers Federation in September 2002. After opening up the organization's Toronto office, as provincial director for Ontario, he was promoted to federal director in January 2004, acting as Ottawa spokesperson until his departure in September 2008, national director in Ottawa.

In 2009, Williamson was hired by Prime Minister Stephen Harper to become director of communications in the PMO and oversaw government-wide communications from his PMO perch. He stepped down in 2010 in order to prepare his campaign after deciding to run for elected office, and was succeeded as director of communications by Dimitri Soudas.

Member of Parliament
Williamson was introduced, along with other candidates for the 41st Parliament, to readers of the St. Croix Courier in an April 2011 interview.

Williamson is an outspoken MP who sometimes speaks up against his own government policies, such as C-30, a bill that ignited some controversy about online anonymity.

Williamson is also responsible for creating public calls for an oil pipeline from its Alberta origin to Saint John, New Brunswick, that would carry undistilled petroleum product to the east and across the St. Lawrence River for refining at the J. D. Irving plant.

Williamson has called repeatedly for the creation of a federal "Sunshine" list that would publish the salary information of public servants who earn over $100,000 per year, as is done in some provinces, for example when he seconded in Parliament Brent Rathgeber's Private Member's Bill C-461, to propose the CBC and Public Service Disclosure and Transparency Act, on two occasions: upon first reading, and then upon reintroduction. Rathgeber resigned from the Conservative caucus on June 5, 2013, and Bill C-461 was knifed by the Conservative caucus in the amendment stage on February 26, 2014.

In April 2012 Williamson visited Toronto restaurant owner, Naveen Polapady, who was charged by Toronto Police with assault causing bodily harm, assault with a weapon and administering a noxious substance (a reference to the thrown spices) after allegedly defending his property from a repeated thief using spices from his kitchen.  Williamson was quoted as saying "Like a lot of Canadians, when I heard this story I was outraged and concerned that once again the Toronto Police had targeted the wrong individual" referring to the previous case of David Chen who had been charged when he apprehended a thief who had been stealing from his Chinatown store.

On April 5, 2012, the Conservative majority in the Canadian Senate voted to scrap the long-gun registry. In a speech in the House of Commons, Williamson quoted Martin Luther King Jr.: "Free at last, free at last", accompanied by cheers by other Conservative MPs.  This comment dismayed many, who thought it inappropriate to paraphrase the words of a man who was killed by a rifle.

On June 1, 2012 a story about Williamson's dismay in regard to International Cooperation Minister Bev Oda's travel expense claims surfaced in a CBC article.  Williamson stated that he had brought the claims up in a caucus meeting but would not specify what he said due to caucus confidence.  A member of his staff did, however, mention it could be taken in context of Williamson's past days as the National Director of the Canadian Taxpayers Federation.

In March 2013 Williamson joined several backbench Conservative MPs in speaking to a Point of Privilege launched by MP Mark Warawa to the Speaker.  Williamson advocated to increase the freedom of individual MPs to speak in the House of Commons by encouraging the Speaker to recognize any MP who wishes to make a Member's Statement and also to pose a question in Question Period.  The practice of the Speaker up to that point had been to recognize MPs who were allocated speaking spots by each party's leadership.

Williamson has said Alward should schedule the Senate vote for the same day as the 2014 provincial election. "I worry that if we wait until 2016, we're going to miss an opportunity, when the next Senate vacancy after that won't be until 2020, and that's an awfully long time," Williamson said.

He also supported Bill C-461, a controversial private member's bill that would have enacted a law that would publicly disclose the names and salaries of every federal employee earning in excess of $188,000.  In a speech supporting the bill, Williamson stated that he thought the threshold should be even lower, and set at the rate of pay of MPs, which was $157,000 at the time.

On October 1, 2014, Williamson made a statement in the House of Commons criticising the incoming Liberal provincial government in New Brunswick over its moratorium on shale gas development.

On March 8, 2015, it was reported that Williamson made this remark about the Temporary Foreign Workers Program: "It makes no sense to pay 'whities' to stay home while we bring in brown people to work in these jobs." Williamson later apologized on Twitter for his "offensive and inappropriate language".

In the 2015 election, Williamson was defeated by Liberal candidate Karen Ludwig. He reclaimed the seat in the 2019 Federal election.

Electoral record

References

External links

1970 births
Members of the House of Commons of Canada from New Brunswick
Conservative Party of Canada MPs
Living people
Canadian political consultants
Politicians from Fredericton
McGill University alumni
Alumni of the London School of Economics
Communications directors of the Canadian Prime Minister's Office
21st-century Canadian politicians
People from Saint Andrews, New Brunswick